Thalaha Kataha  is a village development committee in Siraha District in the Sagarmatha Zone of south-eastern Nepal. At the time of the 1991 Nepal census it had a population of 4224.

Notable People
Notable people from Thalaha Kataha include Dr. Ram Ray, an Associate Professor and Researcher, who has made hundreds of publications and has made contributions to knowledge about landslide hazards.

References

External links
UN map of the municipalities of  Siraha District

Populated places in Siraha District